is a Japanese racing driver. He has competed in a range of motorsport disciplines, including Super GT and European Formula 3. In 2018, Makino joined the FIA Formula 2 Championship with the series' defending champions Russian Time. Currently, Makino is in Japan, competing in Super Formula and Super GT.

Career

Early career
Makino started his motorsport career in karting in 2007 and remained active there until 2013. In 2014 he made the switch to formula racing, where he entered the JAF Japanese Formula 4 Championship. He won one race there.

Formula 4
In 2015, Makino made the move to Japan's new official Formula 4 Championship, and raced for the Rn-sports team. He won four of the championship's first five races at the Okayama International Circuit and Fuji Speedway (both two wins) straight away, but then had to wait until the final race weekend at Twin Ring Motegi to add two more wins to his name. At the end of the season, he finished second with 192 points, just three points fewer than eventual champion Sho Tsuboi.

Formula 3
In 2016, Makino made his Formula 3 debut in the Japanese Formula 3 Championship as a driver from Honda's training program. In this he raced for the TODA Racing team. He took four podiums and was fifth in the championship with 41 points. At the end of the season, he competed in three races of the Super GT for Drago Modulo Honda Racing GT500, taking one podium finish alongside Hideki Mutoh at the Chang International Circuit. He also drove for Toda Racing in the Grand Prix of Macau, in which he finished fourteenth.

In 2017 Makino continued to drive in Formula 3, but made the switch to the European Formula 3 Championship as a driver for Hitech GP. He had a difficult start to the season, scoring only twice in the first half of the year before breaking his wrist and finger in an accident with Harrison Newey at the Norisring. Despite his injury, he only missed the race weekend at Spa-Francorchamps. After his return, he regularly finished in the top 10 with a podium finish at the Red Bull Ring as the highlight. In the end, he finished fifteenth in the final standings with 57 points.

Formula 2
In 2018 Makino made his Formula 2 debut with the Russian Time team. He scored points regularly until he surprisingly won the feature race at the Autodromo Nazionale Monza in the second half of the season thanks to good strategy. He finished thirteenth in the standings with 48 points.

Super Formula
In 2019 Makino returned to Japan to participate in the Super Formula for the team Nakajima Racing. In the end of 2020, Makino suffered from meningitis and thus skipped the Super Formula finale, where he was replaced by Hiroki Otsu. For the 2021 season, Makino moved from Nakajima Racing to Dandelion Racing. But he did not enter the first two rounds, due to still being in healing phase, which meant Ukyo Sasahara covered for him in those races. Makino returned at the third round in Autopolis.

Super GT
In 2019, Makino step up to Super GT GT500 along with his Super Formula program. He competed with Nakajima Racing alongside Narain Karthikeyan. The next season he replaces Jenson Button as he competes with Team Kunimitsu with former GT500 title winner Naoki Yamamoto. Both Yamamoto and Makino won the Super GT title beating Ryo Hirakawa in the last race. Makino continues racing with the team the next season, even tho have to skip one round due to illness.

Karting record

Karting career summary

Racing record

Career summary

Complete Japanese Formula 3 Championship results
(key) (Races in bold indicate pole position) (Races in italics indicate fastest lap)

Complete Super GT results
(key) (Races in bold indicate pole position) (Races in italics indicate fastest lap)

‡ Half points awarded as less than 75% of race distance was completed.

Complete Macau Grand Prix results

Complete FIA Formula 3 European Championship results
(key) (Races in bold indicate pole position) (Races in italics indicate fastest lap)

Complete FIA Formula 2 Championship results
(key) (Races in bold indicate pole position) (Races in italics indicate points for the fastest lap of top ten finishers)

† Driver did not finish the race, but was classified as he completed over 90% of the race distance.

Complete Super Formula results
(key) (Races in bold indicate pole position) (Races in italics indicate fastest lap)

References

External links
  
 

1997 births
Living people
Sportspeople from Osaka
Japanese racing drivers
Japanese Formula 3 Championship drivers
FIA Formula 3 European Championship drivers
Super GT drivers
FIA Formula 2 Championship drivers
Super Formula drivers
Hitech Grand Prix drivers
Motopark Academy drivers
Russian Time drivers
Nakajima Racing drivers
Dandelion Racing drivers
Team Kunimitsu drivers
Virtuosi Racing drivers
Japanese F4 Championship drivers